William Drake (bapt. 1723 – 1801) was an Anglican priest, antiquary and philologist.

Life 
William Drake, second surviving son of Francis Drake, historian, by his wife Mary, third daughter of George Woodyear of Crook Hill, near Doncaster, was baptised at St. Michael-le-Belfry, York, on 10 January 1723. He matriculated at Christ Church, Oxford, on 21 March 1740–1, proceeded BA on 19 October 1744, and took orders. For a few years he was third master of Westminster School. In 1750 he was appointed master of Felstead grammar school, Essex, and rector of Layer Marney in the same county on 1 December 1764. He continued to hold both appointments until 1777, when he was presented to the vicarage of Isleworth, Middlesex. He died at Isleworth on 13 May 1801.

Works 
Drake, who had been elected a fellow of the Society of Antiquaries on 29 March 1770, contributed the following papers to Archæologia: "Letter on the Origin of the word Romance", iv. 142–8; "Observations on two Roman Stations in the county of Essex", v. 137–42; "Letter on the Origin of the English Language", v. 306–17; "Further Remarks on the Origin of the English Language", v. 379–89; "Account of some Discoveries in the Church of Brotherton in the county of York", ix. 253–67; "Observations on the Derivation of the English Language", ix. 332–61.

References

Sources 

 Aungier, George James (1840). The History and Antiquities of Syon Monastery, the Parish of Isleworth, and the Chapelry of Hounslow. London: J. B. Nichols and Son. pp. 145, 161, 183.
 Davies, Robert (1875). "A Memoir of Francis Drake, of York, F.S.A., F.R.S.". Yorkshire Archæological and Topographical Journal. Vol. 3. London: Bradbury, Agnew, and Co. pp. 33–54.
 Goodwin, Gordon; Marchand, J. A. (2004). "Drake, William (bap. 1723, d. 1801), antiquary and philologist". Oxford Dictionary of National Biography. Oxford University Press. Retrieved 8 September 2022.
 Lysons, Daniel (1792). The Environs of London. Vol. 3. London: T. Cadell, jun. and W. Davies. p. 108.
 Morant, Philip (1768). The History and Antiquities of the County of Essex. 2 vols. London: T. Osborne; J. Whiston; S. Baker; L. Davis; C. Reymers; B. White. Vol. 1. p. 409., Vol. 2, p. 421.
 Nichols, John (1812). Literary Anecdotes of the Eighteenth Century. Vol. 2. London: Nichols, Son, and Bentley. p. 87 n.
 Nichols, John (1822). Illustrations of the Literary History of the Eighteenth Century. Vol. 4. John Nichols and Son. p. 620.
 The Gentleman's Magazine. Vol. 20. 1750. p. 237.
 The Gentleman's Magazine. Vol. 71, Part 1. 1801. p. 574.

Attribution

1723 births
1801 deaths
18th-century English Anglican priests
18th-century antiquarians
English antiquarians